L'International des Feux Loto-Québec, also known as the Montreal Fireworks Festival, is the largest and most prestigious fireworks competition in the world. It has been held yearly in La Ronde over the Dolphins lake, since 1985, and is named after its main sponsor, Loto-Québec. It hosts an estimated 3 million spectators each year, with approximately 6,000 fireworks set off during each show.
Each summer, eight or nine pyrotechnical companies from different countries present a 30-minute-long pyromusical show, competing for the Gold, Silver and Bronze Jupiters or trophies.

For the 20th anniversary in 2004, eight of the previous top competitors (all of whom had won the Gold Jupiter) were invited to fight for the unique Platinum Jupiter in June and July 2004, which was won in the end by the German company WECO.

The competition takes the form of a series of biweekly fireworks shows usually beginning in late June and ending in late July. The fireworks are synchronized to music which is also broadcast over a provincial radio station (RockDétente in 2005, Rythme FM 2006-onwards). Spectators can purchase tickets to have reserved seats in La Ronde: they can buy them on site, on-line or through the Admission group to obtain an exceptional view of the lower altitude display and the whole perspective. However, tens of thousands to hundreds of thousands of people watch the fireworks for free from nearby locations (see Where to watch). In 2009 and 2010, the shows were held on Saturday nights only, from June to August, however in 2011 shows were again held on Wednesdays and Saturdays beginning end of June until end of July.

Jupiter winners

* Not awarded.

** 1985 & 1986 Pyromusical Category Winners 

*** 1985 & 1986 Traditional Category Winners

Gold Jupiter winning teams
2021: DID NOT TAKE PLACE DUE TO COVID-19 PANDEMIC. However, throughout the summer of 2021, the event returned following its 2020 cancellation in a miniature, competition-free format where pop-up fireworks shows of five minutes in length would take place at parks in different boroughs and suburbs of Montreal. In compliance with public health measures set forth by the Government of Quebec, organizers would only reveal the boroughs in which the shows would happen on the morning of each day that a show was scheduled to take place, and the exact venue as to where the fireworks would be shot was kept top secret from the public. The mini shows were a lead-up to a 30-minute finale on September 4 that festival organizers hoped to have at La Ronde that would honor essential workers throughout the pandemic. However, Quebec public health did not give festival organizers the green light to have the show on that day, citing concerns about gatherings, and the show was canceled. The communities that hosted the mini fireworks shows were as follows:

2020: DID NOT TAKE PLACE DUE TO COVID-19 PANDEMIC
2019:   Portugal ( Groupo Luso Pirotecnica.)
2018:  Philippines (Dragon Fireworks Inc.)
2017:  England (Jubilee Fireworks Ltd.)
2016:  Spain (Ricasa)
2015:  England (Jubilee Fireworks Ltd.)
2014:  Canada (Fireworks Spectaculars and Royal Pyrotechnie Colab )
2013:  Italy (PyroEmotions & PyrodigiT Team)
2012:  United States (Atlas Pyrovision Productions)
2011:  Italy (Pirotecnica Morsani SRL)
2010:  Canada (Fireworks Spectaculars)
2009:  Canada (Royal Pyrotechnie)
2008:  United States (Pyrotecnico) 
2007:  England (Pains Fireworks) 
2006:  United States (Melrose Pyrotechnics)
2005:  Argentina (Fuegos Artificiales Júpiter)
2004:  Germany - Platinum Jupiter (WECO)
2003:  Canada (Royal Pyrotechnie)
2002:  France (Société Lacroix-Ruggieri)
2001:  Spain (Pirotècnia Igual)
2000:  Germany (Weco Pyrotechnische Fabrik)
1999:  United States (Performance Pyrotechnic Associates)
1998:  United States (Performance Pyrotechnic Associates)
1997:  Italy (Ipon s.r.l.)
1996:  United States (Performance Pyrotechnic Associates)
1995:  Netherlands (JNS Pyrotechniek)
1994:  United States (Performance Pyrotechnic Associates)
1993:  Spain (Pirotecnia Caballer)
1992:  China (Sunny International)
1991:  United States (Pyrotechnology Inc.)
1990:  France (Société Étienne Lacroix)
1989:  Germany (Lünig Feuerwerk Stuttgart)
1988:  Spain (Pirotècnia Igual)
1987:  United States (Austin Fireworks, Inc.)
1986:   Spain (Pirotecnia Caballer)** &  China (Dongguan Fireworks)***
1985:  France (Société Étienne Lacroix)** &  Japan (Marutamaya Ogatsu)*** 

** Winners of the 1985 & 1986 Pyromusical Category     

*** Winners of the 1985 & 1986 Traditional Category

Summer 2019 schedule

 Saturday June 29: Opening 2019 - Throwback 1985 - Firm: Hands Fireworks
 Wednesday July 3:  South Korea - Theme: Dreaming in Montreal - Firm: Hanwha Corporation
 Saturday July 6:  Italy - Theme: One step - Moon Dream - Firm: Parente Fireworks Groups
 Wednesday July 10:  Pörtugal - Theme: Stay Tuned - Firm: Luso Pirotecnia
 Wednesday July 17:  United States Theme: Spirit of the Jungle - Firm: Atlas Pyrovision
 Saturday July 20:  Canada Theme: A First Walk On the Moon - Firm: BEM Fireworks
 Wednesday July 24:  Australia Theme: ShapeShifter - Firm: Howard And Sons 
 Saturday July 27: 25 years of entertaining you in style Casino de Montréal Theme: Finale des Étoiles du Casino de Montréal - Firm: Rozzi's Famous Fireworks - Panzera

Where to watch
Although the fireworks are fired from La Ronde on Île Sainte-Hélène, they can easily be seen from many points in the Montreal area: elsewhere on Île Sainte-Hélène; Longueuil; on the Jacques Cartier Bridge, which is closed to traffic from around 8 p.m. until the end of the show; the Old Port of Montreal; or locations along the side or on a boat on the Saint Lawrence River.

See also
Fireworks competitions

References

External links
Official website
Enthusiast website
All about the competition

Festivals in Montreal
Fireworks in Canada
Fireworks competitions
Summer festivals
Recurring events established in 1985
Parc Jean-Drapeau
1985 establishments in Canada
Annual events in Canada